

Kurt Oppenländer (11 February 1892 – 17 March 1947) was a general in the Wehrmacht of Nazi Germany during World War II who commanded several divisions. He was a recipient of the Knight's Cross of the Iron Cross. Oppenländer died in American custody on 17 March 1947.

Awards and decorations

 Knight's Cross of the Iron Cross on 25 July 1942 as Generalmajor and commander of 305. Infanterie-Division

References

Citations

Bibliography

 

1892 births
1947 deaths
Military personnel from Ulm
Lieutenant generals of the German Army (Wehrmacht)
German Army personnel of World War I
Military personnel of Württemberg
Recipients of the Gold German Cross
Recipients of the Knight's Cross of the Iron Cross
German people who died in prison custody
German prisoners of war in World War II held by the United States
People from the Kingdom of Württemberg
Prisoners who died in United States military detention
Recipients of the clasp to the Iron Cross, 1st class
German Army generals of World War II